Emery Paul Gill (born 26 February 1966) is a Belizean sprinter. He competed in the men's 100 metres at the 1992 Summer Olympics.

References

External links
 

1966 births
Living people
Athletes (track and field) at the 1992 Summer Olympics
Belizean male sprinters
Olympic athletes of Belize
Place of birth missing (living people)